Emirates Flight 521 (EK521/UAE521) was a scheduled international passenger flight from Thiruvananthapuram, India, to Dubai, United Arab Emirates, operated by Emirates using a Boeing 777-300. On 3 August 2016, the aircraft carrying 282 passengers and 18 crew crashed while landing at Dubai International Airport.

All 300 people on board survived the accident; 32 were injured, four were seriously injured. An airport firefighter died during the rescue operation, and another seven firefighters were injured. The accident is the only hull loss of an Emirates aircraft.

Aircraft and crew
The aircraft involved was a Boeing 777-31H with the registration A6-EMW, serial number 32700, and line number 434. It was equipped with two Rolls-Royce Trent 892 engines and was 13 years old, having made its first flight on 7 March 2003. It was delivered new to Emirates on 28 March 2003, and had logged more than 58,000 flight hours in 13,000 cycles before the crash.

The captain was a 34-year-old UAE national who had been with Emirates since March 2001 and had logged 7,457 flight hours, including 5,123 hours on the Boeing 777. The first officer was 37-year-old Jeremy Webb, an Australian national who had been with Emirates since October 2014 and had 7,957 flight hours, with 1,292 of them on the Boeing 777.

Flight
On 3 August 2016, Flight EK521 took off from Trivandrum International Airport (TRV) at 10:34 IST (05:04 UTC), 29 minutes after its scheduled departure time. It was scheduled to land at Dubai International Airport (DXB) at 12:24 GST (08:24 UTC).

The approach and landing were normal from the air traffic control (ATC) point of view, with no emergency declared according to ATC recordings at the time. Shortly after, the tower instructed the next flight to go around and alerted emergency services.

The accident occurred at 12:37 GST (08:37 UTC). Two seconds later, the cockpit RAAS issued a "LONG LANDING"  warning and the crew initiated a go-around. Six seconds after main-wheel touchdown, and with the nose-wheel still off the runway, the aircraft became airborne again after rotating to climb attitude. The flap setting was reduced to 20°, and the undercarriage was selected to retract, but the engine throttle remained unchanged because activation of go-around automation is inhibited after touchdown. Twelve seconds after becoming airborne, the crew manually advanced the throttles to maximum, but the aircraft continued to sink, and it impacted the runway with its undercarriage in a partially retracted state 3 seconds later.

The aircraft first impacted with the underside of its rear fuselage and skidded about  along runway 12L with its landing gear partly retracted as it turned to the right about 120°. As the aircraft skidded down the runway, the number-2 (starboard or right) engine detached and slid along the wing's leading edge toward the wingtip. Firefighting appliances were at the aircraft less than 90 seconds after it came to rest (which was 33 seconds after the initial impact) and started to fight fires at several locations, as all 300 passengers and crew were safely evacuated. Videos from inside the aircraft, taken on passengers' cellphone cameras, showed the passengers failing to evacuate, instead giving priority to carry-on luggage, resulting in an overly long evacuation and heavy criticism. Nine minutes after the aircraft came to a stop, with only the aircraft captain and the senior flight attendant still on board (checking for any remaining passengers), an explosion occurred  as flames reached the aircraft's center fuel tank. The explosion resulted in the death of a firefighter, a Ras al-Khaimah resident named Jasim Issa Mohammed Hasan. Thirty-two of the aircraft's occupants were injured, including the captain and the senior flight attendant, who evacuated after the explosion; the senior flight attendant was the only person among the passengers and crew seriously injured, suffering from smoke inhalation. In addition, seven firefighters were injured, several of the firefighters suffering from heat stroke. The explosion spread the fire to the aircraft's cabin; firefighters needed 16 hours to bring the fire under control. The airport was closed during and following the accident, which resulted in many diverted flights.

Passengers
The aircraft carried 282 passengers and 18 crew members.

Investigation
The General Civil Aviation Authority (GCAA) carried out an investigation into the accident, assisted by Emirates; the aircraft's manufacturer Boeing; and Rolls-Royce, the manufacturer of the 777's engines. In addition, the United States National Transportation Safety Board (NTSB) sent a five-person team to join the other investigators. The flight data recorder and cockpit voice recorder were removed from the aircraft the day after the accident. A preliminary report into the accident was published in September 2016, and an interim statement in August 2017. A preliminary report found that the pilot attempted to take off again after briefly touching down, and that the plane ultimately hit the runway as its landing gear was still retracting.

The final report was released on 6 February 2020. In the report, the following was noted in the causes section:The flight crew did not effectively scan and monitor the primary flight instrumentation parameters during the landing and the attempted go-around. The flight crew were unaware that the autothrottle (A/T) had not responded to move the engine thrust levers to the takeoff/go-around switch (TO/GA) position after the commander pushed the TO/GA switch at the initiation of the FCOM ̶ go-around and missed approach procedure.

Aftermath

Following the accident, the airport was closed for  hours; many flights were diverted to nearby airports such as Abu Dhabi International Airport, Sharjah International Airport, and Al Maktoum International Airport. The closure led Emirates and flydubai to cancel several of their flights, and also affected 23,000 passengers at the airport. Dubai International Airport resumed operations at 18:30 local time, at restricted capacity, using only one runway and maximizing the use of the runways at Al Maktoum International Airport. Arriving aircraft were prioritized over departure flights. The damaged runway was repaired and reopened at 17:45 local time on 4 August, and the airport resumed normal operations on 6 August 72 hours after the accident.

On 11 August, eight days after the crash, Emirates provided US$7000 in compensation for each of the 282 passengers.

Emirates changed the flight number of the Trivandrum to Dubai service to EK523.

Notes

See also
China Airlines Flight 140 and Atlas Air Flight 3591 are other flights that crashed in a go around due to pilot errors.

References

External links

2016 in the United Arab Emirates
2010s in Dubai
Aviation accidents and incidents in 2016
Aviation accidents and incidents in the United Arab Emirates
Accidents and incidents involving the Boeing 777
Airliner accidents and incidents caused by pilot error
August 2016 events in Asia
Emirates (airline)
2016 disasters in the United Arab Emirates